Congress Dances is a 1932 German comedy film directed by Erik Charell and starring Lilian Harvey, Conrad Veidt and Henri Garat. It was an English-language version of the German film Der Kongreß tanzt. A separate French-language version Le congrès s'amuse was also made. It is centered on the Congress of Vienna, where an Austrian commoner is mistaken for the Tsar of Russia.

It was made at the Babelsberg Studio near Berlin. The film's sets were designed by Robert Herlth and Walter Röhrig.

Cast
 Lilian Harvey as Christel
 Conrad Veidt as Prince Metternich
 Henri Garat as Zar Alexander I / Uralsky
 Lil Dagover as Countess
 Gibb McLaughlin as Bibikoff
 Reginald Purdell as Pepi
 Philipp Manning as King of Saxony
 Humberston Wright as Duke of Wellington
 Helen Haye as Princess
 Spencer Trevor as Finance Minister
 Tarquini d'Or as Heurige Singer

References

External links

1932 films
1932 musical comedy films
German musical comedy films
Films of the Weimar Republic
1930s German-language films
German multilingual films
Films directed by Erik Charell
Films set in the 1810s
Films set in Vienna
German black-and-white films
Films produced by Erich Pommer
Cultural depictions of Klemens von Metternich
Cultural depictions of Arthur Wellesley, 1st Duke of Wellington
Films shot at Babelsberg Studios
1930s historical comedy films
German historical comedy films
1932 multilingual films
1930s German films